Bottomley Home Girls' High School is a single-sex secondary school in the Tejkunipara neighborhood of Tejgaon Thana, in Dhaka, Bangladesh. Established as a primary school in 1946, it was upgraded to a secondary school in 1969. As of 2018, it had 35 teachers and 773 pupils.

Notable Students 

Nishat Majumdar, the first Bangladeshi woman to climb Mount Everest.

Anamika Hoque Mukta. Former martial artist and pistol shooter.

References

 High schools in Bangladesh
 Girls' schools in Bangladesh
 Schools in Dhaka